Defending champions Tímea Babos and Kristina Mladenovic defeated Alexa Guarachi and Desirae Krawczyk in the final, 6–4, 7–5 to win the women's doubles tennis title at the 2020 French Open.

Seeds

Draw

Finals

Top half

Section 1

Section 2

Bottom half

Section 3

Section 4

Other entry information

Wild cards

Protected ranking

Withdrawals

Alternate pairs

References

Women's Doubles
2020 WTA Tour